The Demon Headmaster is a British television series based on the children's books by Gillian Cross of the same name. Made for CBBC, the drama was first broadcast between 1996 and 1998. The first series contained six episodes, and aired twice weekly from 2 to 18 January 1996, the second series contained seven episodes and aired weekly from 25 September to 6 November 1996, and the third series contained six episodes and aired twice weekly from 6 to 22 January 1998.

School location scenes in the first series were filmed at Hatch End High School, in Hatch End, Harrow, North West London and The Royal Masonic School for Girls in Rickmansworth, Hertfordshire. Other scenes were filmed around West London, and the Vulcan Tower is in fact the building for Atrium in Uxbridge. CGI was used to make this building appear on a traffic island close to Warwick Avenue. Some scenes in the later series were filmed in the village of Sarratt, Hertfordshire and other locations in Hertfordshire and Buckinghamshire.

A direct sequel of the original series began airing on CBBC from 14 October 2019, with Nicholas Gleaves playing the titular character. It was confirmed on BBC Breakfast that this series was a continuation of the original.

Relation to the books
The television show was based on four of The Demon Headmaster novels by Gillian Cross. The scripts were written by Helen Cresswell. The first three episodes of series one were adapted from the first book, The Demon Headmaster, and episodes 4–6 were adapted from the second book in the series, The Demon Headmaster and the Prime Minister's Brain.

The development of the subsequent stories was more unusual: the second television series was The Demon Headmaster Strikes Again, and the third was The Demon Headmaster Takes Over. Gillian Cross wrote the storylines for each project, and then wrote the books; Helen Cresswell turned the storylines into screenplays.

Episodes

Series 1 (1996)

Series 2 (1996)

Series 3 (1998)

Storyline

Series 1 (Early 1996)

Part 1 – The Demon Headmaster (Episodes 1–3)
Note: Also sometimes known as Look Into My Eyes, though this title does not appear on the screen.

Dinah Glass moves in with the Hunter family and starts going to the same school as her foster brothers Lloyd and Harvey. It is not easy, as they seem to hate her, and school is really strange. Pupils suddenly talk like robots and do weird things, even Dinah finds herself acting oddly. She is sure the headmaster has some kind of power over them, and is determined to find out more. But the Demon Headmaster is equally determined to stop her.

Part 2 – The Prime Minister's Brain (Episodes 4–6)
Octopus Dare is the new computer game at school – everyone is playing it. But only Dinah is any good at it. Soon all she can think about is Octopus Dare. She wins a place at the grand final, and she is delighted. But there is something strange about it all that scares Dinah – so her friends come with her to the final. Before long they find themselves in trouble, as the Computer Director turns out to be their old enemy, the Demon Headmaster.

Series 2 – The Demon Headmaster Strikes Again (Late 1996)
Dinah's father is headhunted for a new job at the Biogenetic Research Centre, but the Demon Headmaster is the director. This time his lust for power sees him meddling with evolution itself; the Headmaster has created an Evolution Accelerator, for which he wants Dinah's DNA to create a "perfect" human, with Dinah's intellect but no emotions. He then puts Dinah into terrible danger to test his theories.

CBBC Pantomime – The Demon Headmaster Takes Over TV (1997)
On 25 December 1997, Christmas Day, CBBC showed The Demon Headmaster Takes Over TV, a recorded version of the CBBC Pantomime, performed at the CBBC Big Bash in National Exhibition Centre, Birmingham that year. Whilst the first two series have been repeated several times on television, this special was only shown once and has never been repeated.

Series 3 – The Demon Headmaster Takes Over (1998)
Dinah and her brothers are pretty sure they are rid of the Demon Headmaster once and for all. When the army starts dismantling the biogenetic research centre Dinah contacts Professor Claudia Rowe, who is an expert on biology and genetics at the nearby university. With Dinah's help, she saves some of the precious materials and they become friends. Then weird things start to happen.

Libraries start closing and their books are taken away. Telephones stop working, and there is no internet access. People start talking like robots, even Claudia Rowe, and more and more of them seem to be wearing strange badges. It all adds up to one thing: the Demon Headmaster must be back. Dinah's search leads her to the university where she finds he has taken over the artificial intelligence project and is developing a Hyperbrain, a computer with superhuman intelligence and the potential to control all information in the world. Both the Demon Headmaster and the newly sentient Hyperbrain want Dinah for knowledge she possesses.

Home media

VHS

DVD

Cast

Series regulars
 Frances Amey as Dinah Glass (credited as Dinah Hunter from Series 1: Part 2) and Eve (Series 2, credited as Dinah/Eve for episodes in which both characters appear)
 Terrence Hardiman as The Demon Headmaster
 Gunnar Cauthery as Lloyd Hunter
 Thomas Szekeres as Harvey Hunter
 Anthony Cumber as Ian
 Kristy Bruce as Ingrid
 Rachael Goodyer as Mandy
 Tessa Peake-Jones as Mrs. Hunter
 Katey Crawford Kastin as Rose Carter (series 1/2)

Series 1 regulars
 Jake Curran as Jeff (episodes 1–3)
 Danny John-Jules as Eddy Hair (episodes 1/3) 
 Florence Hoath as Bess (episodes 4–6) 
 Andrea Berry as Camilla Jefferies (episodes 4–6) 
 Danny Kanaber as Robert Jefferies (episodes 4–6)

Series 2 regulars
 James Richard as Simon James 
 David Lloyd as Mr. Hunter 
 David Baukham as Mr. James

Series 3 regulars
 Jay Barrymore as Michael Dexter 
 Nina Young as Professor Claudia Rowe 
 Richard Hope as Professor Tim Dexter 
 Tony Osoba as Mr. Smith 
 Alphonsia Emmanuel as the Voice of the Hyperbrain and the Hyperbrain Lady 
 Natasha Lee as Kate

Nomination
Best Drama – BAFTA Children's Award 1997.

References

External links

1990s British children's television series
1990s British horror television series
1990s British science fiction television series
1996 British television series debuts
1998 British television series endings
BBC children's television shows
British children's science fiction television series
British television shows based on children's books
Television series by BBC Studios